is a Japanese satellite which launched in May 2010. It is a student-built spacecraft, which will be operated by Soka University, and is intended to be used for technology demonstration. The satellite is a single unit CubeSat, and will be used to test a field programmable gate array in orbit. As part of an outreach programme, it will carry the names of selected children, along with wishes they have made. The satellite will return images of the Earth, which will be given to the participating children.

The launch was conducted by Mitsubishi Heavy Industries under contract to the Japan Aerospace Exploration Agency.  In preparation for a planned launch on 17 May, the H-IIA rocket was rolled out to Pad 1 of the Yoshinobu Launch Complex at the Tanegashima Space Centre on 16 May 2010. It departed the assembly building at 21:01 UTC and arriving at the launch pad 24 minutes later at 21:25 UTC. The terminal countdown began at 11:30 UTC on 17 May and by 15:28, the loading of cryogenic propellant into the rocket's first and second stages had been completed. The launch attempt was scrubbed a few minutes before liftoff due to bad weather, but took place successfully at 21:58:22 UTC on 20 May 2010.

Negai was deployed from a JAXA Picosatellite Deployer attached to the second stage of the H-IIA 202 rocket used in the launch of the Akatsuki spacecraft towards Venus. Negai shared its dispenser with the K-Sat satellite, whilst a second dispenser contained Waseda-SAT2. The three CubeSats separated into low Earth orbit during a coast phase of the launch, between the first and second burns of the second stage. The rocket then continued to Heliocentric orbit, where it deployed Akatsuki, along with the IKAROS and UNITEC-1 spacecraft.

See also

List of CubeSats

References

Spacecraft launched in 2010
Student satellites
Satellites of Japan
CubeSats
Spacecraft which reentered in 2010
Spacecraft launched by H-II rockets